Eagle Bay Provincial Park is a provincial park in British Columbia, Canada which covers 262 hectares of land.

See also
Eagle Bay, British Columbia (Shuswap Country)

References

 

North Coast of British Columbia
Provincial parks of British Columbia
Year of establishment missing